The following is a list of the IRMA's number-one singles of 1996.

Dates given are the Saturday of publication.

See also
1996 in music
List of artists who reached number one in Ireland

1996 in Irish music
1996 record charts
1996